Yahoo Radish was a web-based music playlist archive that worked in conjunction with Yahoo Music Unlimited streaming music service. The site was published in a blog format with archived playlists organized by subject, situation, hits, cover songs and other categories. Users could click on a hyperlink to load and play any of the hundreds of playlists available on the site.

Yahoo Radish was a free service to help music consumers find themed song lists and discover music in The Long Tail.

External links
 http://music.yahoo.com/
 

Online music and lyrics databases
Yahoo!
American music websites